is a Japanese footballer of North Korean descent.

Career statistics

Club
.

Notes

References

External links

2001 births
Living people
Association football people from Tokyo
Meiji University alumni
North Korean footballers
Japanese footballers
Association football midfielders
J3 League players
FC Tokyo players
FC Tokyo U-23 players